UNESCO Special Envoys are personalities associated with various UNESCO programmes and projects who help to spread UNESCO’s message worldwide through their professional activities and their personal charisma.

The following is a list of UNESCO Special Envoys along with the position they are currently assuming:
 Metin Arditi, UNESCO Honorary Ambassador and Special Envoy for Intercultural Dialogue since 2014,
 Beate Klarsfeld and Serge Klarsfeld, UNESCO Honorary Ambassadors and Special Envoys for Education about the History of Holocaust and Genocide Prevention since October 2015,
 Sheikha Mozah Bint Nasser Al-Missned, Special Envoy for Basic and Higher Education since January 2003,
 Judith Pisar, UNESCO Special Envoy for Cultural Diplomacy since June 2017,
 Mintimer Shaimiev, UNESCO Special Envoy for Interculural Dialogue since August 2017,
 Forest Whitaker, UNESCO Special Envoy for Peace and Reconciliation since June 2011,
 Mwai Kibaki, UNESCO Special Envoy for water in Africa since April 2016,
 Princess Laurentien of the Netherlands, UNESCO Special Envoy on Literacy for Development since 2009,
 Peng Liyuan, UNESCO Special Envoy for the Advancement of Girl's and Women’s Education since March 2014,
 Hedva Ser, UNESCO Goodwill Ambassador and Special Envoy for Cultural Diplomacy since March 2017,
 Princess Sumaya bint Hassan, UNESCO Special Envoy for Science for Peace since October 2017.

Former Envoys
 Prince Talal ibn Abd al-Aziz (1931-2018) - Special Envoy for Water
 The Right Honourable Michaëlle Jean - Special Envoy for Haiti, resigned in 2014
 Samuel Pisar (1929-2015) - Honorary Ambassador and Special Envoy for Holocaust Education

See also
UNESCO Goodwill Ambassador
UNESCO Champion for Sport
UNESCO Artist for Peace

References
UNESCO: Special Envoys

UNESCO
Goodwill ambassador programmes
United Nations goodwill ambassadors